Keefe, Bruyette & Woods, Inc., a Stifel Company, is an investment banking firm headquartered in New York City, specializing exclusively in the financial services sector. KBW's primary business lines include research, corporate finance, equity sales and trading, equity capital markets, debt capital markets, and asset management.
 
The firm provides a broad range of services to corporate clients such as banking companies, insurance companies, real estate and REITs, broker-dealers, mortgage banks, asset management companies, and specialty finance firms as well as to the institutional investor community. KBW's research analysts cover more than 600 companies in the financial services industry globally.

The company, which was founded in 1962, currently has nine offices in the United States as well as an office in London. In 2013, KBW was acquired by Stifel Financial, a financial services holding Company, for $575 million. KBW has advised on 65 percent of all bank M&A since 2017.

History
The firm was founded in 1962 by Harry Keefe Jr., Gene Bruyette and Norbert Woods.  The three founders previously had worked together at Tucker, Anthony & R. L. Day.  Beginning in the 1950s, Keefe had been one of the first Wall Street research analysts to focus on bank stocks, which later became the specialty of the firm he co-founded. Norbert Woods died in 1972 and the firm was led by Keefe and Bruyette through the 1970s and 1980s.

Under Harry Keefe, the firm advised on several mergers that helped form large regional banks in the 1980s. The firm advised on a series of deals that created the Bank of New England out of smaller banks in Massachusetts and Connecticut. KBW also advised on the creation of SunTrust Bank from a group of Florida and Georgia based banks. In 1985, KBW negotiated the merger of Wachovia and First National Bank of Atlanta.  In 2005, the firm was sole adviser to Bank of America in its takeover of MBNA. More recently, in 2019, KBW advised Chemical Financial on its $3.6 billion merger with TCF Financial  and Prosperity Bancshares on its $2.1 billion acquisition of LegacyTexas Financial Group.

Harry Keefe left the firm in 1989 after a business dispute with his associates and founded his own money management and consulting firm.  By 1990, KBW had transitioned management of the firm from the original founders to a new group including Charles Lott and James McDermott.  Gene Bruyette retired from the firm in 1991. James McDermott was later convicted of violating insider trading rules in 2000 by providing stock tips to a girlfriend. John Duffy succeeded him and was named president and chief executive officer in September 2001.

In October 2011, Duffy was appointed Vice Chairman and Thomas Michaud was named president and chief executive officer of KBW. Michaud had been KBW's Vice Chairman and Chief Operating Officer since September 2001.

Impact of September 11, 2001 
The company's prior New York headquarters was located on the 88th and 89th floors of the World Trade Center's South tower at the time of the terrorist attacks of September 11, 2001. Out of the firm's 172 New York employees, 67 died as a result of the attack when the South tower collapsed.  Among the employees killed in the attack were the firm's co-CEO Joseph Berry, CFO Jeffrey Fox, as well as several notable research analysts Christopher W. Murphy, David Berry, Dean Eberling and Thomas Theurkauf.

The firm has held an annual 9/11 memorial service and also maintains a charitable fund it set up to help victims' families.

On July 25, 2018, the New York City medical examiner announced that the remains of another employee killed in the attack, 26-year-old Scott Michael Johnson, had been identified using methods of DNA analysis that were not available in 2001. Johnson worked as a securities analyst for the company.

European expansion 

In the late 1990s the firm began considering a move into Europe on the back of resurgent demand for specialist equity research and brokerage houses. The firm held abortive merger talks with London-based boutique investment bank Fox-Pitt, Kelton in 1998, and had been engaged in discussions with BNP about a possible acquisition in early 2001.  The strategic expansion was postponed in late 2001 as the firm dealt with the fallout from the September 11 attacks.

In November 2004, KBW announced it would be investing $20 million into Europe with the intention of replicating its North American success by offering specialist research on 110 European financial stocks by 2005.

The European subsidiary Keefe, Bruyette & Woods Limited was incorporated in London and by December 2004 the team had grown to 34. Vasco Moreno was named as chief executive officer and director of European research, moving from rival European boutique Fox, Pitt Kelton. KBW made 13 other senior hires from Fox-Pitt, including Richard Wynn-Griffith as Director of Equity Sales.

The move was a financial success, with the European business raising the firm's profile and generating $20 million in revenue as early as 2005. The firm also secured membership at the Euronext, London Stock Exchange, Deutsche Borse and SIX stock exchanges, a move which consolidated KBW's position as a specialist broker.

In 2014, the European subsidiary was absorbed by Stifel Financial's London business after the merger between the two parent companies. Moreno resigned in October 2013.

Initial Public Offering

In 2005, KBW was the eighth largest trader of NASDAQ 100 financial stocks—greater than Goldman Sachs and Bear Stearns, despite having only 430 employees. For 2004 and 2005 the firm's investment bank was the No.1 ranked financial services M&A advisor and IPO manager globally, having advised on deals totalling $39 billion in 2005. The firm also ranked No.1 in five of their seven specialist research categories in a survey by Institutional Investor in December 2005.

On the back of this success, KBW completed a $143 million initial public offering of stock, floating 6.8 million shares on 9 November 2006.  The firm was traded on the NYSE under the ticker 'KBW'. The joint bookrunners for the initial public offering were Keefe, Bruyette & Woods, Inc. and Merrill Lynch. As of the end of 2010, KBW employees owned approximately one-third of the stock in the firm.

Asian expansion 
Following the success of the firm's foray into Europe in 2004, KBW announced in May 2010 it would be opening offices in Hong Kong and Tokyo offering research, sales & trading, and capital markets advisory to institutional clients in the Asia-Pacific region. The new equity research business targeted an additional 91 Asian financial services companies, making KBW's global research platform of 600 companies in 33 countries the largest specialist financial services research franchise.

Bik San Leung was named as chief operating officer for KBW's Asian franchise, supervising 16 initial hires in Hong Kong and 4 in Tokyo. As in Europe, much of the firm's senior staff had been hired from Fox-Pitt, Kelton's Asian business. Thomas Michaud and Vasco Moreno were also appointed as Non-Executive Directors to oversee the development of the franchise.

Merger with Stifel 
On 5 November 2012, Stifel Financial announced they would be acquiring KBW in its entirety for $575 million. KBW was the third bank to merge with Stifel since 2010 as part of Stifel's efforts to become the pre-eminent middle-market investment bank. The merger was completed on 15 February 2013. Keefe, Bruyette & Woods retained its own identity as a specialist in financial services operating under the Stifel umbrella, and Thomas Michaud retained his role as chief executive officer of KBW and was made a member of Stifel’s Institutional Group Management Committee.

Business overview 
The firm now operates under the Stifel umbrella as a financial services specialist, providing the following services to its clients:

Investment banking 
KBW provides strategic advisory to private equity groups and corporations offering debt, equity & convertible capital raising, mergers & acquisitions and restructuring services.

Sales and trading 
KBW offers equity and fixed income sales & trading services to institutional clients. The firm levers Stifel's technology to provide acquisition integration, balance sheet advisory, investment portfolio analysis and reporting as well as product-specific strategies designed to improve overall performance.

Research 
Together with Stifel, KBW's Equity Research division is the industry's largest provider of small and mid-cap equity research. The firms cover 1,600 global companies in 12 sectors and remain the provider with the broadest global financial coverage. The firm also provides macroeconomic research on the global financial services sector, FinTech and has a quantitative analysis group.

Public finance 
KBW helps state and local government agencies raise capital and implement financing strategies that allow them to build and maintain infrastructure for the communities they serve.

Equity capital markets 
Together with Stifel, the firm's Equity Capital Markets group is responsible for the origination, underwriting, marketing, allocation and pricing of equity and equity-linked offerings across all sectors. KBW has been ranked the No.1 bookrunner of financial services common stock offerings since 2015, with a 71% market share since 2018.

See also
List of tenants in Two World Trade Center

References

External links
Keefe, Bruyette & Woods (company website)

Companies formerly listed on the New York Stock Exchange
Investment banks in the United States
Investment companies based in New York City
Financial services companies established in 1962
2006 initial public offerings
2012 mergers and acquisitions
1962 establishments in New York City